Sa Kaeo is a town (thesaban mueang) in Thailand, about 48 kilometers from the Thai-Cambodian border and 200 km east of Bangkok. It is the capital of Sa Kaeo province. As of 2005, it had a population of 16,591. The town covers 11 sub-districts (tambon).

In 1979–1980 Sa Kaeo was the site of the Sa Kaeo Refugee Camp.

Climate

References

External links

http://www.sakaeocity.go.th (Thai)

Populated places in Sa Kaeo province